Andrew Swann (also known as Harry Swan) (1878 – unknown) was a Scottish professional footballer who played in the Football League for Barnsley, Woolwich Arsenal and Stockport County as a centre forward. He was most notable for being the Football League Division Two top scorer for the 1900–01 season whilst playing for Barnsley. He was born in Dalbeattie in the historical county of Kirkcudbrightshire in Scotland.

Career 
After spells with Lincoln City and New Brompton, Swann rose to prominence playing for Barnsley in the Football League Division Two, and was the league's top scorer during the 1900–01 season, with 18 goals.

Following this season, he switched to division rivals Woolwich Arsenal, and made his debut in a 2–1 victory against his old club on 2 September 1901, scoring in the process. However, his time at the Manor Ground would yield just one more goal in six more appearances, with his last game and goal coming in a 1–0 victory over Doncaster Rovers on 30 November 1901. After a brief spell at Gainsborough Trinity, Swann switched to Stockport County the following month, going on to score four goals in 14 appearances for the side.

He returned to Scotland in 1902, before returning to England to play for Mexborough, followed by two Southern Football League games for Tottenham Hotspur during the 1904–05 season. He later played for Partick Thistle.

References

1878 births
People from Dalbeattie
Year of death unknown
Scottish footballers
Association football forwards
English Football League players
Southern Football League players
Lincoln City F.C. players
Gillingham F.C. players
Barnsley F.C. players
Arsenal F.C. players
Gainsborough Trinity F.C. players
Stockport County F.C. players
Mexborough Town F.C. players
Tottenham Hotspur F.C. players
Partick Thistle F.C. players